Pentarane, or pentaran, may refer to:

 Pentarane A (D'6-pentarane)
 Pentarane B (mecigestone)